The Robert Award for Best Danish Television Series is one of the merit awards presented by the Danish Film Academy at the annual Robert Awards ceremony. The award has been handed out since 2013.

Honorees

2010s 
 2014: Borgen III – Charlotte Sieling
 2015: The Legacy –  and Pernilla August
 2016: The Legacy II – Maya Ilsøe and Jesper Christensen
 2017: Bedrag – Jeppe Gjervig Gram and Per Fly
 2018: Herrens Veje – Adam Price and Kaspar Munk
 2019: Herrens Veje II – Adam Price and Kaspar Munk

References

External links 
  

2013 establishments in Denmark
Awards established in 2013
Danish Television Series
Television awards